Emperor Wulie may refer to:

Sun Jian (155–191), warlord whose son Sun Quan founded the Eastern Wu dynasty
Helian Bobo (381–425), founding emperor of the Hu Xia dynasty
Li Yuanhao (1003–1048), founding emperor of the Western Xia dynasty